The 2010–11 George Mason Patriots men's basketball team represented George Mason University during the 2010–11 college basketball season.  This was the 45th season for the program.  Led by fourteenth-year head coach Jim Larranaga, the Patriots were members of the Colonial Athletic Association (CAA) and played home games on campus at the Patriot Center in Fairfax, Virginia.

Undefeated at home, George Mason finished the regular season at 25–5 (16–2 in CAA) to win the conference's regular season championship. The Patriots were upset in the semifinals of the conference tournament to fourth-seeded VCU. GMU received an at-large bid in the NCAA tournament and were the eighth seed in the East region.

After the season, Larranaga left for the University of Miami and was succeeded by Paul Hewitt, previously the head coach at Georgia Tech.

Season notes
 After a February 15 victory over VCU, the men's basketball team set a new school record with twelve consecutive wins.
 From August 18 to August 28, the men's basketball team toured Italy and were scheduled to play four games against Italian semi-professional teams, the final game had to be canceled due to poor court conditions. The Patriots won all three games versus Lombardia, GMV Ghezzano and Forlì.

Awards

CAA Coach of the Year
 Jim Larranaga

First Team All-CAA
 Cam Long

Second Team All-CAA
 Ryan Pearson

Third Team All-CAA
 Luke Hancock

CAA Player of the Week
 Ryan Pearson - Jan. 17
 Cam Long - Jan. 24
 Ryan Pearson - Feb. 7
 Ryan Pearson - Feb. 21

Roster

Stats

Game log

|-
!colspan=12 style=| Exhibition

|-
!colspan=12 style=| Regular season

|-
!colspan=12 style=|CAA tournament

|-
!colspan=12 style=|NCAA tournament

|-
|colspan=9|

Recruiting
The following is a list of players signed for the 2011–12 season:

References

George Mason
George Mason Patriots men's basketball seasons
George Mason
George Mason
George Mason